Tien-Yien Li (李天岩) (June 28, 1945 – June 25, 2020) was a University Distinguished Professor of Mathematics and University Distinguished Professor Emeritus at Michigan State University. There, he spent 42 years and supervised 26 Ph.D. dissertations.

Early life and education 
Li was born on June 28, 1945 in Sha County, Fujian Province, China. At age three, he was brought to Taiwan by his parents. He earned his B.S. in Mathematics at the National Tsinghua University in 1968. Li received his doctorate in 1974 from University of Maryland under the guidance of James Yorke.

Academic career 
Li joined the faculty of the Department of Mathematics at Michigan State University in 1976 and was promoted to the rank of full professor in 1983.  He retired as a University Distinguished Professor Emeritus in 2018 after spending 42 years at the university. Li and his supervisor James Yorke published a paper in 1975 entitled  Period three implies chaos, in which the mathematical term chaos was coined. He also proved Ulam's conjecture in the field of computation of invariant measures of chaotic dynamical systems. Working with Kellogg and Yorke, Li's ideas and the use of numerical methods in computing Brouwer's fixed point, part of the field of modern Homotopy Continuation methods.

Awards and honors
 Guggenheim Fellow, 1995
 Distinguished Faculty Award, College of Natural Science, Michigan State University, 1996.
 Distinguished Faculty Award, Michigan State University, 1996.
 J.S.Frame Teaching Award, 1996.
 University Distinguished Professor, Michigan State University, 1998.
 Distinguished Alumni, College of Sciences, Tsing Hua University, Taiwan, 2002.
 Outstanding Academic Advisor Award, College of Natural Science, Michigan State University, 2006.
 National Tsinghua University's Outstanding Alumni Award, Taiwan, 2012.

References

External links
 T. Y. Li, and J. A. Yorke, Period Three Implies Chaos, American Mathematical Monthly 82, 985 (1975)
 Celebration of Life Dr. Tien-Yien Li (1945-2020)
Dr. Tien-Yien Li

1945 births
2020 deaths
American educators
American people of Chinese descent
20th-century Taiwanese  mathematicians
21st-century American mathematicians